Tambet Pikkor (born 17 April 1980) is an Estonian ski jumper. He competed at the 1998 Winter Olympics, the 2002 Winter Olympics, and the 2006 Winter Olympics.

References

1980 births
Living people
Estonian male ski jumpers
Estonian male Nordic combined skiers
Olympic ski jumpers of Estonia
Olympic Nordic combined skiers of Estonia
Ski jumpers at the 2002 Winter Olympics
Nordic combined skiers at the 1998 Winter Olympics
Nordic combined skiers at the 2002 Winter Olympics
Nordic combined skiers at the 2006 Winter Olympics
Sportspeople from Tallinn